Wellington was a provincial electoral division in the Canadian province of Manitoba. It was first created by redistribution in 1957, and formally came into being in the provincial election of 1958. The riding was eliminated in 1979, but was re-established in 1989. It was eliminated again for the 2011 election. It is located in the northwestern section of the city of Winnipeg, and is named after Arthur Wellesley, 1st Duke of Wellington.

Wellington was bordered on the east by Point Douglas, to the south by Minto and St. James, to the north by Inkster and Burrows, and to the west by the rural riding of Lakeside.

The riding's population in 1996 was 20,283. In 1999, the average family income was $32,907, with 43% of the riding's residents listed as low-income (the third highest in the province). The unemployment rate is 16%. Over 45% of the riding's dwellings are rental units, and one family in four is single-parent. Wellington's ethnic base was diverse. Seventeen per cent of its residents were aboriginal, 15% Filipino, 7% Portuguese, 3% Chinese and 2% East Indian. Manufacturing accounted for 27% of Wellington's industry, with a further 16% in services.

The riding was held by the Progressive Conservatives from 1958 to 1966. The NDP won the seat in 1966, and held it until the riding's dissolution in 1981. They also won every election since the riding's re-emergence in 1990. It was considered a safe seat for the party. In 2003, veteran MLA Conrad Santos was re-elected for the riding with almost 75% of the vote.

Following the 2008 electoral redistribution, the riding was dissolved into St. James, Minto, and the new ridings of Tyndall Park (electoral district) and Logan. This change took effect for the 2011 election.

List of provincial representatives

Electoral history

References

Former provincial electoral districts of Manitoba
Politics of Winnipeg
1957 establishments in Manitoba
1989 establishments in Manitoba
1979 disestablishments in Canada